G/O Media Inc. is an American media holding company that runs Gizmodo, Kotaku, Jalopnik, Deadspin, Lifehacker, Jezebel, The Root, The A.V. Club, The Takeout, The Onion, The Inventory, and Quartz.

History
G/O was formed in April 2019 when Great Hill Partners, a private equity firm, purchased the websites from Univision for $20.6 million. Prior to the sale, the former Gawker Media properties had operated as Gizmodo Media Group after being acquired by Univision following the conclusion of the Bollea v. Gawker lawsuit and subsequent bankruptcy in 2016. Former Forbes executive Jim Spanfeller became the CEO of G/O Media.

Conflict with leadership
G/O Media's leadership, introduced after the purchase from Univision, has been subject to frequent criticism by employees. Complaints include closer advertiser relationships, a lack of diversity, and suppression of reporting about the company itself. In October 2019 Deadspin's editor-in-chief, Barry Petchesky, was fired for refusing to adhere to a directive that the site "stick to sports." Soon after, the entirety of Deadspin staff resigned in protest leaving the site inactive. In January 2020 the GMG Union, which represents the staff of six G/O Media sites, announced a vote of no confidence in CEO Jim Spanfeller citing, among other issues, a lack of willingness to negotiate for "functional editorial independence protections."

On February 4, 2021, the Writers Guild of America East filed a complaint with the National Labor Relations Board alleging that G/O Media had told employees that they had fired Alex Cranz for labor activism.

In Mid-October 2021, G/O Media removed all images from the 11 websites it owns — such as Gizmodo, Jalopnik, Deadspin, The A.V. Club, The Onion, and Jezebel — without any announcement or notice.

In November 2021 Gawker released an article detailing substantial staff resignations at Jezebel over the course of 2021 comprising around 75% of staff. Much of the reasoning behind this was placed at the feet of a "hostile work environment" created by G/O's management and the new deputy editorial director Lea Goldman. This was followed by another article in January 2022 detailing similar staff decline at The Root, with 15 out of 16 full-time staff having left over the course of 2021 since the introduction of Vanessa De Luca as editor-in-chief.

In January 2022, it emerged that seven senior staff at The A.V. Club were leaving the site after a management mandate requiring them to move from Chicago to Los Angeles. A lack of salary uplift to account for increased costs of living was cited as a main reason for leaving.

On March 1, 2022, GMG Union members went on strike after failing to reach an agreement on a new contract. The strike was resolved on March 6 with a proposed new contract including some of the members' terms.

Acquisitions 
In April 2022, it was announced that G/O Media had acquired the Quartz news brand.

References

Further reading

External links
 

Gawker Media
Mass media companies based in New York City
Mass media companies established in 2019